Taranis gratiosa is a species of sea snail, a marine gastropod mollusk in the family Raphitomidae.

Description
The length of the shell attains 3.7 mm, its diameter 2 mm.

The shell is very small. The spire-whorls contain 3 spiral cords, the uppermost feeble . The axial threads are distinctly  retrocurrent and flexuous. The suture is distinctly margined.

(Original description) The very small shel lis fusiform. it is white, thin, turriculate, spirally distantly ribbed, and with numerous axial distinctly retrocurrent and flexuous threads.

Sculpture : The spire-whorls below the smooth protoconch have a fine thread margining the suture below, a second very prominent spiral cord on the angle of the shoulder, and a third equally strong cord at the middle between the angle and the suture below. The interstices are concave and broader than the cords. The body whorl contains 6 spirals from the angle down toward the base, the upper three of which are strong, the others closer together and not so high. The base shows a few indistinct spirals. The axial sculpture consists of subequidistant fine threads, slightly retrocurrent on the shoulder, flexuous further down. On the body whorl they are becoming more irregular, fine growth-lines appearing in the interstices.

The colour of the shell is whitish. The spire is conic, turriculate, about the same height as the aperture. The protoconch is globular, smooth, of l¼ whorls. The shell contains four whorls, with a very distinct and but slightly sloping shoulder. The base is somewhat contracted. The suture is superficial, margined. The aperture is subpyriform, angled above, with a short and broad siphonal canal below, slightly emarginate at the base. The outer lip is angled above, then convex, contracted below, thin and sharp, crenulated on the outside by the spirals. The sinus is rounded, not deep, situated just above the carina. The columella is straight, smooth, concave on meeting the parietal wall, bent to the left towards the siphonal canal below. The inner lip is thin, narrow, extending over the faintly convex parietal wall, tapering to a fine point below. The operculum is unknown.

Distribution
This marine species is endemic to New Zealand and occurs off Stewart Island to Dusky Sound and Fiordland.

References

 Suter, H. (1908a) Descriptions of new species of New Zealand marine shells. Proceedings of the Malacological Society of London, 8, 178–191, pl. 7
 Powell, A.W.B. 1979 New Zealand Mollusca: Marine, Land and Freshwater Shells, Collins, Auckland 
 Maxwell, P.A. (2009). Cenozoic Mollusca. pp 232–254 in Gordon, D.P. (ed.) New Zealand inventory of biodiversity. Volume one. Kingdom Animalia: Radiata, Lophotrochozoa, Deuterostomia. Canterbury University Press, Christchurch.
 Spencer, H.G., Marshall, B.A. & Willan, R.C. (2009). Checklist of New Zealand living Mollusca. pp 196–219. in: Gordon, D.P. (ed.) New Zealand inventory of biodiversity. Volume one. Kingdom Animalia: Radiata, Lophotrochozoa, Deuterostomia. Canterbury University Press, Christchurch.

External links
 Powell, A. W. B. The family Turridae in the Indo-Pacific. Part 1a. The subfamily Turrinae concluded, Indo-Pacific mollusca. vol. 1, 1964
 
 Spencer H.G., Willan R.C., Marshall B.A. & Murray T.J. (2011). Checklist of the Recent Mollusca Recorded from the New Zealand Exclusive Economic Zone

gratiosa
Gastropods described in 1908
Gastropods of New Zealand